The Jakaltek  (Jacaltec) language , also known as Jakalteko (Jacalteco) or Poptiʼ, is a Mayan language of Guatemala spoken by 90,000 Jakaltek people in the department of Huehuetenango, and some 500 the adjoining part of Chiapas in southern Mexico. The name Poptiʼ for the language is used by the Academia de Lenguas Mayas de Guatemala and the Guatemalan Congress.

Distribution
Municipalities where Jakaltek is spoken include the following (Variación Dialectal en Poptiʼ, 2000).

 Concepción Huista
 Jacaltenango (including the following villages)
 San Marcos Huista
 San Andrés Huista
 Yinhchʼewex
 Nentón
 San Antonio Huista
 Santa Ana Huista
 Guadalupe Victoria, Chiapas, Mexico
 Buxup
 Tzisbʼaj

Phonology
The Eastern Jakaltek language includes the following phonemes.  The orthography used by the Academia de Lenguas Mayas de Guatemala is on the left, the other main orthography is on the right.

Eastern Jakaltek is one of the few languages besides the Malagasy language of Madagascar to make use of an n-trema character in its alphabet. In both languages, the n-trema represents a velar nasal consonant  (like "ng" in "bang").

Jakaltek-language programming is carried by the CDI's radio station XEVFS, broadcasting from Las Margaritas, Chiapas.

Grammar
The Jakaltek language has a verb–subject–object syntax. Like many Native American languages,  Jakaltek has complex agglutinative morphology and uses ergative–absolutive case alignment. It is divided in two dialects, Eastern and Western Jakalteko. "Eastern and Western Jakalteko understand each other's spoken languages, but not written text."

Jakaltek is unusual in that it has four systems of noun and numeral classifiers.

Owing to Jakaltek's dissimilarity with Indo-European languages, the reasonably healthy linguistic population and the relative ease of access to Guatemala, Jakaltek has become a favorite of students of linguistic typology.

References

External links 
Jacalteco Collection of Colette Grinevald – Collection of audio recordings in Jakaltek at the Archive of the Indigenous Languages of the Americas 

Agglutinative languages
Indigenous languages of Mexico
Indigenous languages of Central America
Languages of Guatemala
Huehuetenango Department
Mayan languages
Indigenous peoples of Central America
Mesoamerican languages
Verb–subject–object languages